Intermediate cutaneous may refer to:
Intermediate cutaneous nerve of thigh
Intermediate dorsal cutaneous nerve of the foot